Leroy Daniels was a shoeshine man who sang and danced as he worked, and whose act led to an appearance with Fred Astaire in the 1953 musical The Band Wagon. It was the only time that Astaire danced on-screen with a black dancer.

Daniels' act also served as inspiration for the choreography of the scene in the film.

His performances became the inspiration for the song, Chattanooga Shoeshine Boy, which in 1950 became a #1 hit for Country music singer Red Foley.

Daniels subsequently made other screen appearances, including Handle With Care (1964), Petey Wheatstraw (1977), Disco Godfather (1979), and Avenging Angel (1985). He also appeared in the TV series Sanford and Son.

References

External links 
 

African-American male dancers
African-American male actors
Black people in television
1928 births
Place of birth missing
1993 deaths
Place of death missing